Alexander was a country ship (i.e.,  she traded east of the Cape of Good Hope) launched in 1812. She was lost in 1835.

Career
Although Alexander appears in a compendium of vessels that traded between the United Kingdom and India under a license from the British East India Company,  there is no record of such a voyage or voyages in Lloyd's Register. She did appear in various issues of the East-India register and directory.

Fate
Alexander was lost in the China Sea in 1835.

Citations and references
Citations

References
 
 

1812 ships
British ships built in India
Age of Sail merchant ships of England
Maritime incidents in 1835